Nerine Desmond (1908-1993) was a South African artist known particularly for her watercolour and oil paintings, especially landscapes, seascapes, portraits, Basuto horsemen, and pastoral scenes showing cattle herders and goat herders with their animals.

Biography 
Desmond was born in Constantia, Cape Town in 1908, the daughter of Nicolaas Johannes Smith, an Afrikaner clergyman, and Ivy Desmond. and London's Central School of Art in 1938, where she learned graphic-printing techniques; but was otherwise largely self-taught. Desmond was politically conservative, and once refused the use of one of her works on the cover of a novel by Nadine Gordimer, stating in justification that Gordimer was "not a loyal South African."

Career 
Desmond exhibited in South Africa from 1935 until her death, initially both as a member of the South African Society of Artists and the rival New Group. She was influenced by a number of artists active at the time, including Gregoire Boonzaier and Frieda Lock, becoming well known for her portrait painting and farm-related and rural subjects. Initially she worked from a studio in Loop Street, Cape Town. Later she painted at her homes in Hout Bay, Wynberg, Jonkershoek, and her last home in Onderpapegaaiberg, Stellenbosch.

. In 1948 she painted extensively in South West Africa (now Namibia); and in 1953 similarly in Zanzibar and Mombasa, Kenya.

A South African 1961 one-cent postage stamp carried a design by Desmond and in the same year she was elected as Fellow of the International Institute of Arts and Letters. She exhibited in all three Quadrennials of South African Art between 1956 and 1964, as well as at the São Paulo Biennale (graphic), Brazil in 1961.

She exhibited with the Women's International Art Club and the Royal Institute of Painters, and held solo shows in Johannesburg in 1962 and Pretoria in 1970. 
Her works are held in the following collections: Bloemfontein: Oliewenhuis Art Gallery; Cape Town: Iziko South African National Gallery; Durban Art Gallery; East London: Ann Bryant Art Gallery; Graaff-Reinet: Hester Rupert Art Museum; Johannesburg Art Gallery; Kimberley: William Humphreys Art Gallery; Pietermaritzburg: Tatham Art Gallery; Port Elizabeth: Nelson Mandela Art Museum; Pretoria Art Museum; SABC art collection. In addition, her works were acquired by HM Queen Elizabeth The Queen Mother; William Ormsby-Gore, 4th Baron Harlech; and Alfred Beit et al.

Notes

References

Bibliography

20th-century South African painters
South African women painters
1908 births
1993 deaths